Kyrkhult is a locality situated in Olofström Municipality, Blekinge County, Sweden with 937 inhabitants in 2010.

References 

Populated places in Olofström Municipality